The Meguro Kinen (Japanese 目黒記念) is a Grade 2 handicap horse race for Thoroughbreds aged at least four years old, run in May over a distance of 2,500 metres at Tokyo Racecourse.

It was first run in 1932 over 3400 metres at Meguro Racecourse and was later run over 3900 metres and 3200 metres before being run over its current distance for the first time in 1952. The race was elevated to Grade 2 class in 1984. Although the race moved to Tokyo Racecourse when Meguro Racecourse closed in 1934 the race retained the name of its original venue.

Winners since 2000

Earlier winners

 1984 - Dai Sekitai
 1985 - Mr Le Mans
 1986 - Bingo Timur
 1987 - Mount Nizon
 1988 - Mejiro Fulmar
 1989 - Kiri Power
 1990 - Marutaka Tyson
 1991 - Carib Song
 1992 - Yamanin Global
 1993 - Matikanetannhauser
 1994 - Narita Taishin
 1995 - Hagino Real King
 1996 - Yu Sensho
 1997 - Agnes Kamikaze
 1998 - Going Suzuka
 1999 - Rosen Kavalier

See also
 Horse racing in Japan
 List of Japanese flat horse races

References

Turf races in Japan